Daniel Cavanagh (1830 –1901) was a member of the Wisconsin State Assembly and the Wisconsin State Senate.

Biography
Cavanagh was born on February 3 (or 22), 1830 in Dingle, Ireland. He would reside in Erin, Wisconsin before moving to Osceola, Fond du Lac County, Wisconsin in 1849. By trade, he was a farmer.

Political career
Cavanagh was a member of the Assembly in 1870. He represented the 20th District in the Senate from 1876 to 1877. In addition, Cavanagh was elected Treasurer of Osceola in 1861 and was Chairman (similar to Mayor) of the Board of Supervisors (similar to city council) from 1864 to 1866 and again from 1869 to 1875. He was a Democrat.

References

External links
The Political Graveyard

1830 births
1901 deaths
People from Dingle
Irish emigrants to the United States (before 1923)
People from Washington County, Wisconsin
People from Osceola, Fond du Lac County, Wisconsin
Democratic Party Wisconsin state senators
Mayors of places in Wisconsin
Democratic Party members of the Wisconsin State Assembly
Wisconsin city council members
City and town treasurers in the United States
Farmers from Wisconsin
19th-century American politicians